Pope John XXII (1244 – 4 December 1334), born Jacques Duèze (or d'Euse), was head of the Catholic Church from 7 August 1316 to his death in December 1334.

He was the second and longest-reigning Avignon Pope, elected by the Conclave of Cardinals, which was assembled in Lyon through the work of King Louis X's brother Philip, the Count of Poitiers. Like his predecessor, Clement V, Pope John centralized power and income in the Papacy and lived a princely life in Avignon.

John excommunicated the enemies of Edward II of England, while warning Edward of a possible reassessment of the papal grant of Ireland. He opposed the political policies of Louis IV of Bavaria as Holy Roman Emperor, which prompted Louis to invade Italy and set up an antipope, Nicholas V. John opposed the Franciscan understanding of the poverty of Christ and his apostles, passing multiple papal bulls to enforce his views. This led William of Ockham to write against unlimited papal power. Following a three year process, John canonized Thomas Aquinas on 18 July 1323.

After surviving an assassination attempt from poison and witchcraft, John passed a papal bull against witchcraft and threatened excommunication for anyone learning it. Facing backlash from his beatific vision sermons, John retracted his statement just before his death. John died in Avignon on 4 December 1334.

Early life and election 
Born in 1244, Jacques was the son of Arnaud Duèze, who was probably a  merchant or banker. He studied canon law at Montpellier and theology in Paris.

Jacques taught civil law at Cahors and later canon at Toulouse. By 1295, he was counselor to the Bishop Louis of Toulouse. Following Louis' death in 1297, Jacques was installed as the temporary chancellor of the University of Avignon and by 1299 was canon of Puy. On the recommendation of Charles II of Naples he was made Bishop of Fréjus in 1300. Jacques was still bishop of Fréjus when in 1307, a knight named William d'Arcis and a priest named Bertrand Recordus attempted to kill him. Both were imprisoned and later sentenced to death in 1309.

In 1308, Jacques was appointed chancellor of Charles II, and it was due to his influence that the gladiatorial games in Naples were banned. On 18 March 1310, he was made Bishop of Avignon. He delivered legal opinions favorable to the suppression of the Templars, but he also defended Boniface VIII and the Bull Unam Sanctam. On 23 December 1312, Clement V made him Cardinal-Bishop of Porto-Santa Rufina.

The limits of papal power became a source of conflict between reigning pope Clement V and Emperor Henry VII, culminating with the sudden death of Pope Clement V in 1314. The period that followed was an interregnum of two years due to disagreements between the cardinals, who were split into three factions. After two years of inaction, Philip, Count of Poitiers summoned a papal conclave of twenty-three cardinals to Lyon in August 1316. Philip announced that none of the cardinals would be allowed to leave until they had chosen a new Pope. This conclave elected Jacques on 7 August 1316, who took the name John XXII and was crowned in Lyon. He set up his residence in Avignon rather than Rome, continuing the Avignon Papacy of his predecessor.

Papacy 

Upon his election, John XXII gave 35,000 florins, of the 70,000 left to him by Clement V, to the cardinals that had voted for him. 

He was an excellent administrator and efficient at reorganizing the Catholic Church. He favored a regulation-heavy form of governance.

John XXII was known to have a temper.

John involved himself in the politics and religious movements of many European countries in order to advance the interests of the church. He would routinely write to non-Catholic leaders asserting his authority over them.

His close links with the French crown created widespread distrust of the papacy.

On 7 April 1317, John canonized Louis of Toulouse with the bull Sol oriens.

In 1318, he sent a letter of thanks to the Muslim ruler Uzbeg Khan, who was very tolerant of Christians and treated Christians kindly.

John has traditionally been credited with having composed the prayer "Anima Christi", which has become the English "Soul of Christ, sanctify me ...".

On 27 March 1329, John condemned many writings of Meister Eckhart as heretical in his papal bull In Agro Dominico. He allowed the consuls of Cahors to establish a small university in that city.

John died in Avignon on 4 December 1334 (aged 89/90). He was buried, in Avignon, at the cathedral of Notre-Dame-des-Doms.

Edward II and Irish bishoprics 
John received an embassy, in December 1316, from Edward II of England concerning the empty bishoprics of Dublin and Cashel. Included in his preferred appointees, Edward was adamant that John not promote any native Irishman to bishop or archbishop. John, promoted, William FitzJohn, bishop of Ossory to the bishopric of Cashel, while Alexander Bicknor, a personal recommendation of Edward, was given Dublin.

In January 1318, John sent a congratulatory letter to Edward on his victory over Edward Bruce. He had passed an excommunication of all enemies of Edward and later singled out Robert and Edward Bruce. John had allowed Edward to keep the crusade tax imposed by the Council of Vienne, while reminding him that England was a papal fief and that he owed John an oath of loyalty. A few months later, John heard from Irish princes petitioning for the replacement of Edward as sovereign lord of Ireland, stating that successive kings of England had not respected the papal grant of Ireland to Henry II of England. John's letter to Edward inferred that a second papal evaluation of the lordship of Ireland was not out of the question.

Canonization of Thomas Aquinas 
By November 1317, Guillelmo de Tocco, Prior of the Benevento Dominican monastery, was heading a preliminary investigation into Thomas Aquinas' sainthood. In the Summer of 1318, John  met with de Tocco, who presented letters from the regal heads of Sicily imploring for a papal inquiry into the sainthood of Aquinas. De Tocco also presented John with notarized records of Aquinas' miracles and requests from princes and universities asking for Aquinas' canonization.

John chose three cardinals, none of whom was a Dominican, to scrutinize the presented records. Finding no errors, they gave their recommendation to John. John then issued two letters nominating: Umberto, Archbishop of Naples, Angelo, Bishop of Viterbo, and Pandulpho de Sabbello, who was unable to attend, as papal commissioners.

De Tocco gather two of the three papal commissioners in the Archbishop's palace in Naples. The inquiry lasted from 21 July to 18 September 1319. On the final day, the documentation of the inquiry was signed, sealed and sent to the Papal Curia at Avignon. Upon receiving the documents John turned them over to a cardinal committee. On 23 June 1321, John created a new commission consisting of Peter Ferri, Bishop of Agnani, Andrew, Bishop of Terracina, and Pandulpho de Sabbello. This inquiry lasted fifteen days, during which the commission heard the testimony of one hundred eleven witnesses. The commission sent finalized documents to the Papal Curia and John XXII canonized Thomas Aquinas formally on 18 July 1323.

Conflict with Louis IV 
Prior to John XXII's election, a contest had begun for the Holy Roman Empire's crown between Louis IV of Bavaria and Frederick I of Austria. Initially, John was neutral and refrained from being an arbiter. On 25 November 1314, Louis, with the votes from five of the six electors, was crowned king of the Germans at Aix-la-Chapelle, by the archbishop of Mainz, while Frederick only received two votes the day before. In response, in April 1317, John imposed a new concept, vacante imperio, granting the power to administer the empire to the pope, which was contained within the papal bull, Si fratrum.

By 1322, faced with a growing Ghibelline movement in northern Italy, John had instructed his papal legate, Bertrand du Poujet, to call for a crusade against Milan. Louis, acting with Imperial powers, sent an army to reinforce Milan in early 1323. In response, John detailed violations committed by Louis and upon receiving no response excommunicated him on 23 March 1324 and then deposed him on 11 July. Louis called a council of Italian Ghibellines to Trent, there Louis declared his support for the Spiritualist Franciscans and denounced John as an illegitimate and heretical pope. John retaliated by declaring any city to offer Louis welcome would be placed under interdict. He received an embassy from Rome which issued an ultimatum of either returning to Rome or suffer the Holy City's submission to Louis IV. John sent his papal legate, Giovanni Orsini, to Rome, but was denied entry. In reprisal, Orsini placed Rome under interdict.

Louis entered Rome on 17 January 1328. In St. Peter's cathedral, he was consecrated by two sympathetic cardinal bishops, and crowned by Rome's representative, Sciarra della Colonna. Pietro Rainalducci was created Antipope Nicholas V in May 1328, by Louis. Following Louis' coronation of Nicholas V, Franciscan Minister General Michael Cesena, Bonagrazia Bergamo, and William of Ockham all fled Avignon. In 1330, Antipope Nicholas V submitted just before the Pope's death.

Between November 1331 and March 1332, John made four questionable sermons concerning the beatific vision. Louis, sensing an opportunity to remove him, conspired with cardinal Napoleone Orsini to depose John at an ecumenical council. John, however, became ill and reversed his statements before dying.

Franciscan poverty 

John XXII was determined to suppress what he considered to be the excesses of the Spirituals, who contended eagerly for the view that Christ and his apostles had possessed absolutely nothing, citing Pope Nicholas III's bull Exiit qui seminat in support of their view. On 7 October 1317, John XXII promulgated the papal bull Quorumdam exigit, clarifying the previous bulls issued by Nicholas III and Clement V, Exiit qui seminat and Exivi de paradiso, and stating unequivocally that obedience was greater than chastity or poverty. On 26 March 1322, with Quia nonnunquam, he removed the ban on discussion of Exiit qui seminat and commissioned experts to examine the idea of poverty based on belief that Christ and the apostles owned nothing. The experts disagreed among themselves, but the majority condemned the idea on the grounds that it would condemn the church's right to have possessions. The Franciscan chapter held in Perugia in June 1322 responded with two encyclicals stating that all judgments made by the Roman Church were to be regarded as final and could not be revoked if they were not erroneous. By the bull Ad conditorem canonum of 8 December 1322, John XXII declared it ridiculous to pretend that every scrap of food given to the friars and eaten by them belonged to the pope, refused to accept ownership over the goods of the Franciscans in future and granted them exemption from the rule that absolutely forbade ownership of anything even in common, thus forcing them to accept ownership. On 12 November 1323, he issued the bull Quum inter nonnullos, which declared "erroneous and heretical" the doctrine that Christ and his apostles had no possessions whatsoever.

Influential members of the order protested, such as the minister general Michael of Cesena, the English provincial William of Ockham, and Bonagratia of Bergamo. In reply to the argument of his opponents that Nicholas III's bull Exiit qui seminat was fixed and irrevocable, John XXII issued the bull Quia quorundam on 10 November 1324, in which he declared that it cannot be inferred from the words of the 1279 bull that Christ and the apostles had nothing, adding: "Indeed, it can be inferred rather that the Gospel life lived by Christ and the Apostles did not exclude some possessions in common, since living 'without property' does not require that those living thus should have nothing in common." With the bull Quia vir reprobus of 16 November 1329, John replied to Michael of Cesena's Appellatio.

Beatific vision controversy 
John XXII argued that those who died in the faith did not see the presence of God until the Last Judgment. This caused a theological controversy concerning the beatific vision. He continued this argument for a time in sermons while he was pope, although he never taught it in official documents. In January 1334, in complete opposition to John XXII, the Faculty of Theology of Sorbonne stated that after death the blessed souls were raised to the beatific vision. He eventually backed down from his position the day before his death, and agreed that those who died in grace do indeed immediately enjoy the beatific vision.

Role in witchcraft suppression 
The thought of witchcraft seemed to be in its early stages, while Kors states John XXII had a personal reason for setting out to stop witchcraft.  Kors points to the fact that Pope John had been the victim of an assassination attempt via poisoning and sorcery. As such, Pope John's involvement with witchcraft persecution can be officially traced to his 1326 papal bull Super illius specula in which he laid out a description of those who engage in witchcraft.  Pope John also warned people against not only learning magic or teaching it but against the more “execrable” act of performing magic.  Pope John stated that anyone who did not heed his “most charitable” warning would be excommunicated. Pope John officially declared witchcraft to be heresy, and thus it could be tried under the Inquisition.  Although this was the official ruling for the church, Pope John's first order dealing with magic being tried by the Inquisition was in a letter written in 1320 by Cardinal William of Santa Sabina.  The letter was addressed to the Inquisitors of Carcassonne and Toulouse.  In the letter Cardinal William states that with the authority of Pope John the Inquisitors there were to investigate witches by “whatever means available” as if witches were any other heretic. The letter went on to describe the actions of those who would be seen as witches and extended power to the Inquisition for the prosecution of any and all cases that fit any part of the description laid out in the letter.

See also 
 Bernard Jarre – Catholic cardinal
 Spondent Pariter – papal decretal issued by Pope John XXII forbidding fraudulent alchemy.

Notes

References

Sources 

Boudet, Jean-Patrice  and Julien Théry (2012).  « Le procès de Jean XXII contre l'archevêque d'Aix Robert de Mauvoisin : astrologie, arts prohibés et politique (1317–1318) », in Jean XXII et le Midi (Cahiers de Fanjeaux, 45), Toulouse, Privat, 2012, pp. 159–235.
Brown, Jaqueline (1991). "The Declaratio on Jon XXII's Decree Exercrabilis and the Early History of the Rota," Bulletin of Medieval Canon Law, 47 (n.s. Vol. 21), pp. 47–139.

Nold, Patrick (2003). Pope John XXII and his Franciscan Cardinal: Bertrand de la Tour and the Apostolic Poverty Controversy. Oxford.

 (in French)

External links 
 Catholic encyclopedia entry

 
1244 births
1334 deaths
People from Cahors
Popes
French popes
Cardinal-bishops of Porto
Avignon Papacy
14th-century French Roman Catholic bishops
14th-century popes